The list of ship decommissionings in 1984 includes a chronological list of all ships decommissioned in 1984.


See also 

1984
 Ship decommissionings
Ship